Reshma Bombaywala is an Indian model, jewellery designer, and actress who won the Miss Beautiful Smile at Femina Miss India, and was the first runner-up in Gladrags in the year 1995. She is married to noted mixologist and Discovery Channel's Cocktail Kings's host Dimitri Lezinska

Modelling
Reshma was spotted by noted Bollywood choreographer, Sangeet Chopra. She has modelled for Wendell Rodricks, Hemant Trivedi, Shahab Durazi and Azeem Khan, and has appeared in several Hindi film and Indipop dance numbers. She modeled as an undergraduate at Mumbai College.

Filmography and Television
 "Koi Sehari Babu Dil Laheri Babu Remix" - Audiobiography by Asha Bhosle UMI10 Vol 2
 "Marhaba Marhaba" - Garv: Pride and Honour - 2004
 "Thoda daru vich pyaar mila de" song from the movie "Tum Bin"
 "Saun di Jhadi" Babbu Maan

References

External links
http://weddingsutra.com/celeb_wed/celeb_reshma.asp

http://www.bollywoodmantra.com/picture/reshma-bombaywala-s-birthday-bash-4/

Female models from Mumbai
Living people
Femina Miss India winners
Beauty pageant contestants from India
Year of birth missing (living people)